Kuroshima Research Station started in 1973, under the name of the UnderwaterPark Foundation, Yaeyama Underwater Park Research Institute,　for the purpose of managing and utilizing the underwater area in Sekisei(Jap. 石西) lagoon between Ishigaki (Jap. 石垣) Island and Iriomote (Jap. 西表) Island including Kuroshima (Jap. 黒島) Island. From the beginning, it worked as ocean research station, and existed until 2002 under the financial support of Nagoya Railroad Business Operations Co. Ltd.
At present Kuroshima Research Station belongs to the NPO Sea Turtle Association of Japan. Its activities worthy of mention are its 30 years’ research into the nesting of sea turtles, especially confirmation of the nesting of the hawksbill sea turtle for the first time in Japan, in addition to confirming the nesting of green sea turtles. Their research regarding acanthasters and corals deserves special mention. In 2005, they sponsored the Japanese Sea Turtle Conference, which is held every year at the location of sea turtles nesting rookeries in Japan.

References

External links
Sea Turtle Association of Japan
Japan Committee for IUCN
Mexican, Japanese and U.S. Fishermen Celebrate Sea Turtle's Epic Journey and Commit to Conservation
The nature of Yaeyama Islands

Turtle conservation organizations
Animal welfare organizations based in Japan
Environmental organizations based in Japan
Environmental organizations established in 1973
1973 establishments in Japan